DXFJ (100.7 FM), on-air as Radyo Bandera 100.7 News FM, is a radio station owned and operated by Bandera News Philippines. Its studios and transmitter are located at the 2nd Floor, Dr. Santos Yu Bldg., Donasco St., Brgy. Bag-ong Lungsod, Tandag.

References

Radio stations in Surigao del Sur
Radio stations established in 2018